Ivan Bernasconi (born 19 October 1974 in Como) is an Italian high jumper.

He won gold medal in 1999 at the 2nd editions of the Military World Games.

Biography
Ivan Bernasconi participated at one edition of the European Athletics Indoor Championships (2000), he has 7 caps in national team from 1997 to 2003.

National titles
He has won 3 times the individual national championship.
1 win in the high jump (2000)
2 wins in the high jump indoor (1998, 1999)

See also
 High jump winners of Italian Athletics Championships

References

External links
 

1974 births
Italian male high jumpers
Italian athletics coaches
Living people